Ward Bauwens (born 4 May 1993 in Leuven) is a Belgian swimmer, who specialized in individual medley events. Bauwens is a resident athlete for Brabo Antwerp, and currently, a medicine student at the University of Antwerp.

Before his Olympic debut, Bauwens broke his own 400 IM record several times. On 16 March 2012 he posted a time of 4:19.55 to blast a 16-year-old record (4:19.82), held by Stefaan Maene since 1995, at the Belgian Championships in Antwerp.

Bauwens qualified for the men's 400 m individual medley, by clearing a 4:19 barrier, and eclipsing a FINA B-cut of 4:18.24 from the European Championships in Debrecen, Hungary. He surged past Luxembourg's Raphaël Stacchiotti with a freestyle kick to top the second heat by 0.49 of a second, breaking his own Belgian record of 4:16.71. Bauwens failed to advance into the final, as he placed sixteenth overall on the first day of the preliminaries.

References

External links
NBC Olympics Profile

1993 births
Living people
Belgian male medley swimmers
Olympic swimmers of Belgium
Swimmers at the 2012 Summer Olympics
Sportspeople from Leuven
20th-century Belgian people
21st-century Belgian people